The battle of Skanör was a battle during the War of the Outlaws on 9 July 1289.

Following the siege of Copenhagen in 1289, the town of Skanör was attacked by the Leidgang fleet of King Erik II.

The cities of Ven and Amager had been burned the day before by the Leidgang fleet.

Skanör would not suffer the same fate as the other cities; the Norwegian Chieftain Thord Krytter fell in the battle with 70 other men, but the town was not destroyed.

It is not known if Jacob Nielsen and Stig Andersen Hvide took part in the battle but it is known they were a part of the fleet; but it is not known if the whole fleet attacked.

References

Conflicts in 1289
Scania
13th century in Sweden